Fleur Una Maude Beale  (née Corney, born 22 February 1945) is a New Zealand teenage fiction writer, best known for her novel I Am Not Esther, which has been published worldwide.

Biography
Beale was one of six children of a dairy farmer, Cedric Corney, and of a teacher and author, Estelle Corney (née Cook). She was born in Inglewood, Taranaki, New Zealand, on the farm where her father was born. Beale grew up in the town and attended Inglewood High School From 1958, before attending Victoria University, Wellington and Christchurch Teachers' College, where she met her husband, Tim (Timothy Gerald Beale). She taught at Melville High School in Hamilton from the mid 1980s to the late 1990s. Beale's first stories were written for the children's radio programme Grandpa's Place. Her first book was a small reader and picture book for young children and she started to write for teenagers in 1993.  Her stories often involve troubled adolescents engaged in outdoor activities.

Beale was a finalist in the AIM Children's Book Awards (junior fiction) and her 1998 novel I Am Not Esther was shortlisted for the senior fiction section of the 1999 New Zealand Post Children's Book Awards. In 1999 she was awarded the Children's Writing Fellowship at Dunedin College of Education and quit teaching to write full-time. Her 2001 novel Ambushed was a finalist for the Junior Fiction section of the 2002 New Zealand Post Children's Book Awards. Her 2004 account of how an indigenous girl discovers how her education can save her tribal lands (My Story A New Song in the Land. The Writings of Atapo, Pahia, c.1840) received a Storylines Notable Book Award in 2005, as did Walking Lightly. In 2012, Beale became the last recipient of the Margaret Mahy Award during Margaret Mahy's lifetime.

In the 2015 New Year Honours, Beale was appointed an Officer of the New Zealand Order of Merit for services to literature.

I Am Not Esther
Fourteen-year-old Kirby Greenland's mother leaves her with unfamiliar relatives in a strange city, supposedly leaving New Zealand for two years to help refugees. Kirby's new guardians and their six children belong to a strict fundamentalist Christian sect called the Children of the Faith. They abhor all recreation and any immodesty, devoting themselves to industry and bible study. They insist that Kirby must leave her old self behind and emphasise that Kirby dissent, her uncle insists that the entire family prays over her until she repents. Concern for her youngest cousin prompts her to relent but she soon becomes aware that she is losing her identity and determines to escape although she feels responsible for the cousins that she has grown to love. She is also concerned about the fate of her cousin, Miriam, who disappeared shortly before her arrival, but is barely mentioned by the family, other than her being "dead". She knows that not all the children of the cult members are completely indoctrinated: her cousin Daniel wants to be a doctor, despite the proscription on higher education, and her schoolfriends misbehave when they are away from home. Kirby and Daniel are thrown out of the sect at the end of the book because he reveals his wish to be a doctor "so I can help you all". A mass brawl/fight scene ensues as the Elders beat Daniel. They go to Wellington, and find Kirby's mother in a psychiatric hospital and help her to recover. Meanwhile, Kirby has been having nightmares about becoming Esther again; it is only when she sees a documentary about the faith that she realises "Esther is dead".

The title I Am Not Esther comes from Kirby's catchphrase "I am not Esther", as this is what her aunt, uncle and other people in the faith insist on calling her. She is worried that she is turning into Esther particularly when it is pointed out to her that Kirby would have said "I'm not Esther" – the faith did not use abbreviated words.

Beale was inspired to write this by "a boy I taught who had been thrown out of his family because he wanted to be a doctor". She describes the cultists with respect; she is hostile to the behaviour and not the people. Despite this, the cultists are depicted as brutal opponents of the brave doubters, largely as a consequence of using Kirby's perspective.

In 2012, Beale published a sequel to I Am Not Esther, titled I am Rebecca. One of the sequels is written from the perspective of her cousin Rebecca, who is moving to Nelson with the rest of her family, as shown at the end of I Am Not Esther. The third book is called "Being Magdalene" which is written from Magdalene's point of view.

Printed works

The Great Pumpkin Battle (1988), Shortland
A Surprise for Anna (1990), Cocky's Circle
Slide the Corner (1992), Scholastic
Against the Tide (1993), HarperCollins
Driving a Bargain (1993), HarperCollins
Over the Edge (1994), Scholastic
The Fortune Teller (1995), HarperCollins
Dear Pop (1995), Land's End
The Rich and Famous Body and the Empty Chequebook (1995), Land's End
Fifteen and Screaming (1996), HarperCollins
Rockman (1996), HarperCollins
Further Back than Zero (1998), Scholastic
Keep Out (1999), Learning Media
Destination Disaster (1999), Shortland
Playing to Win (2000), Scholastic
Trucker (2000), Learning Media
Deadly Prospect (2000), Scholastic
Ambushed (2000), Scholastic
Seven readers for Pearson Education, Singapore (2001)
Lucky for Some  (2002), Scholastic
Red Dog in Bandit Country (2003), Longacre [non-fiction]
Lacey and the Drama Queens (2004), Scholastic
My Story A New Song in the Land. The Writings of Atapo, Pahia, c.1840 (2004), Scholastic
Walking Lightly (2004), Mallinson Rendel
A Respectable Girl (2006), Random House
The Transformation of Minna Hargreaves (2007), Random House 
My Life of Crime (2007), Mallinson Rendel
Slide the Corner (2007), Scholastic
End of the Alphabet (2009), Random House
Dirt Bomb (2011), Random House
 The Juno series:
 Juno of Taris (2008) 
 Fierce September (2010) 
 Heart of Danger (2011)
 I Am Not Esther
 I Am Not Esther (1998), 
 I am Rebecca (2014), 
 Being Magdalene (2015), Random House

References

External links
Short story by Fleur Beale
Melville High School

1945 births
Living people
New Zealand children's writers
New Zealand women children's writers
People from Inglewood, New Zealand
People educated at Inglewood High School, New Zealand
Officers of the New Zealand Order of Merit